Nadim Kobeissi (born 28 September 1990) is a French-Lebanese computer science researcher specialized in applied cryptography. He is the author of Cryptocat, an open-source encrypted web chat client. Kobeissi is also known for speaking publicly against Internet censorship and Internet surveillance.

Early life and education
Kobeissi was born in Beirut, Lebanon. He studied at the Lebanese American University in Beirut from 2008 to 2009, and graduated with a degree in philosophy at Concordia University in Montreal, Canada in 2013.

Kobeissi was a Ph.D. student in applied cryptography at Inria in Paris. from 2015 to 2018.

In 2018 and 2019 he was adjunct professor of computer science at New York University's Paris campus teaching a course on computer security. In 2021 Kobeissi was naturalized French Citizen. Kobeissi is fluent in Arabic, French, and English and is based in Paris.

Research
Kobeissi is the primary author of Cryptocat. The project was discontinued in 2019.

In 2015, Kobeissi became active in researching formal verification for cryptographic protocols. In December 2018, he defended his Ph.D. thesis, "Formal Verification for Real-World Cryptographic Protocols and Implementations. (Vérification formelle des protocoles et des implementations cryptographiques).".

Activism
In 2010, Kobeissi was an early supporter of US army whistleblower Chelsea Manning. He organized a march through Montreal in December that year in support of WikiLeaks, ran a WikiLeaks mirror site, and defended WikiLeaks on various Canadian news publications. During 2011 and 2012, Kobeissi hosted CHOMP.FM, a radio program on Internet activism that ran weekly on Montreal's CKUT-FM radio station. The show included guests from the Electronic Frontier Foundation (EFF), security researcher Bruce Schneier, and journalist Glenn Greenwald.

In 2013, Kobeissi led an effort known as the Skype Open Letter which brought together more than forty organizations, including the Electronic Frontier Foundation, Reporters Without Borders, and the Open Technology Institute, calling on Microsoft and Skype to release transparency reports regarding Skype monitoring and surveillance. The effort was successful, and Microsoft released its first transparency report shortly after the letter was published.

Entrepreneurship
In 2017, Kobeissi founded Symbolic Software, which offers security audits for company infrastructure, software code, and cryptographic protocols.

In January 2021, a tweet by Kobeissi about his plans to design a form of "decentralized social media" immediately sparked the interest of several investors and led to the creation of Capsule Social, Inc. a startup whose mission is to build a truly decentralized social media platform to foster free speech, making it more resilient to censorship and control.

References

External links

 Capsule Social, Inc.
 Symbolic Software
 Personal website
 Techcrunch article about Capsule Social

1990 births
Living people
Cryptographers
Computer security specialists
Concordia University alumni
Lebanese expatriates in France
Scientists from Beirut